Denis McGinley (born 27 April 1945) is a former Irish Fine Gael politician who served as a Minister of State from 2011 to 2014. He served as a Teachta Dála (TD) for the Donegal South-West constituency from 1982 to 2016.

Background
McGinley was born and brought up in Gweedore, County Donegal, a Gaeltacht area where he still resides. He was educated at Coláiste Íosagáin, Ballyvourney, County Cork; St Patrick's College, Dublin; and University College Dublin where he received a Bachelor of Arts degree. He worked as a teacher and principal at Scoil Chonaill at Bunbeg, Gweedore, before entering into politics.

Political life
McGinley was first elected to Dáil Éireann at the February 1982 general election. During this time he has held a number of Front Bench positions within the party, including Spokesman on Youth Affairs (1987–88), the Gaeltacht (1988–91), the Gaeltacht and Emigrant Welfare (1991–94), Youth Affairs (1994), Arts, Heritage, Gaeltacht and the Islands (2001–02), Defence (2002–04) and Community, Rural and Gaeltacht Affairs (2004–07).

McGinley was Chairman of An Comhchoiste don Ghaeilge (Oireachtas Committee on the Irish Language) from 1995 to 1997. He is a former member of the Joint Oireachtas Committees on Social Affairs and on Small Business and is a member of the British Irish Parliamentary Body since 1993.

In June 2006, he announced his intention to retire at the 2007 general election; however, he announced in February 2007, that he had changed his mind, and would stand as he stood a better chance of being elected than the selected candidate. He was re-elected at the 2007 general election, and again at the 2011 general election.

On 10 March 2011, he was appointed by the Fine Gael–Labour government as Minister of State at the Department of Arts, Heritage and the Gaeltacht with special responsibility for Gaeltacht Affairs on the nomination of Taoiseach Enda Kenny. He was dropped as a Minister of State in a reshuffle in July 2014. Shortly afterwards, he announced that he would not contest the 2016 general election.

References

 

1945 births
Living people
Alumni of St Patrick's College, Dublin
Alumni of University College Dublin
Fine Gael TDs
Heads of schools in Ireland
Irish schoolteachers
Members of the 23rd Dáil
Members of the 24th Dáil
Members of the 25th Dáil
Members of the 26th Dáil
Members of the 27th Dáil
Members of the 28th Dáil
Members of the 29th Dáil
Members of the 30th Dáil
Members of the 31st Dáil
Ministers of State of the 31st Dáil
People from Gweedore
Politicians from County Donegal